"When the Snow Is on the Roses" is a song that was an adult contemporary hit for Ed Ames in 1967, spending four weeks at #1 on the easy listening chart, but only reached #98 on the Billboard Hot 100. In 1972, a version recorded by Sonny James went to number one on the country charts.

Song history
The song was originally recorded by Ames in 1967. In 1968, it was covered by Anita Bryant on her album, In Remembrance of You (The Story of a Love Affair), and by Roy Drusky on his album, Jody and the Kid.  

Sonny James had just finished a successful stay at Capitol Records, where he had enjoyed a string of 16 consecutive No. 1 hits during the late 1960s and early 1970s, and had signed with Columbia Records in 1972. His cover version of "When the Snow is On the Roses" was his first single for Columbia Records and it began another long string of hits by "The Southern Gentleman". The song was his 22nd No. 1 song on the Billboard Hot Country Singles chart in mid-September 1972.

Ernst Bader wrote the original lyrics to the song in German. Larry Kusik and Eddie Snyder wrote the English translation. The music was by James Last.

Elvis Presley also sang this song live in Las Vegas on August 24, 1970, in the MS (Midnight Show). This performance is registered in the Live In Las Vegas BMG box set. It is an audience recording.

Chart performance

References

Hyatt, Wesley (1999). The Billboard Book of #1 Adult Contemporary Hits (Billboard Publications)

1967 singles
1972 singles
Ed Ames songs
Sonny James songs
Songs written by Eddie Snyder
Columbia Records singles
Song recordings produced by George Richey
Songs with lyrics by Larry Kusik
1967 songs
Songs with lyrics by Ernst Bader